Down Argentine Way is a 1940 American musical film made in Technicolor by Twentieth Century Fox. It made a star of Betty Grable in her first leading role for the studio although she had already appeared in 31 films, and it introduced American audiences to Carmen Miranda. It also starred Don Ameche, The Nicholas Brothers, Charlotte Greenwood, and J. Carrol Naish.

The film was directed by Irving Cummings and produced by Darryl F. Zanuck from a screenplay by Karl Tunberg and Darrell Ware, based on a story by Rian James and Ralph Spence. The cinematography was by Leon Shamroy and Ray Rennahan, and the costume design was by Travis Banton. The American-composed music was by Harry Warren and Jimmy McHugh, with lyrics by Mack Gordon and Al Dubin.

Shooting lasted for 10 months in which members of the film's crew traveled about 35,000 miles. A second unit was sent to Buenos Aires for location establishing shots, returning with about 20,000 feet of film, and another group flew to New York City and filmed Miranda for over a month. Miranda was then performing South American songs in the Broadway production The Streets of Paris. She was thus a prominent participant in the film although she spent no time in Hollywood.

In 2014, Down Argentine Way was deemed "culturally, historically, or aesthetically significant" by the Library of Congress and selected for preservation in the National Film Registry.

Summary
The film begins with Carmen Miranda singing South American Way, followed by a montage of the Argentine capital Buenos Aires.

Young Ricardo Quintana (Don Ameche) is preparing to voyage from Argentina to New York to sell some of his father's prize horses. Before leaving, Don Diego Quintana (Henry Stephenson) instructs his son that no steeds are to be sold to Binnie Crawford (Charlotte Greenwood) or any member of her family because her brother Willis cheated him years earlier. Upon arriving in New York and displaying his horses at a racetrack, Ricardo falls in love with Glenda Crawford (Betty Grable), and goes to dinner with her later that evening. When he learns that she is Binnie's niece, he refuses to sell her the horse she wants to buy, instead selling it to her best friend Helen (Kay Aldridge). He hurriedly returns to Argentina, while Glenda, perturbed by his sudden change, follows him, accompanied by her Aunt.

The couple meet again in Argentina at a performance by Carmen Miranda, where they eventually confess their love for each other. When Binnie attempts to buy horses from Don Diego in person, he has her and her tour guide, Tito (Leonid Kinskey), evicted from his property. Ricardo subsequently introduces Glenda to his father as Miss Cunningham. When Ricardo realizes that their horse trainer Casiano has been privately racing his father's prize jumper, Furioso, Glenda encourages Ricardo to enter Furioso in a race, against Don Diego's wishes. Soon after, while attending a horse show, Don Diego discovers Glenda's true identity and disowns his son for becoming involved with Crawfords. His bad mood is compounded when Furioso refuses to jump and runs off the field.

To make up for the humiliating defeat, Ricardo, Glenda and Casiano enter Furioso in the big race at San Isidro. When Don Diego finds out he is furious, but Casiano changes his mind when he tells him Furioso ran the mile in 1:36. As Don Diego prepares to bet a large amount of money on his horse, Tito meanwhile, switches jockeys and has the race fixed so Furioso will lose, causing Binnie to discharge him. When Furioso overcomes the crooked jockey and wins the race, Don Diego changes his mind about racing horses and accepts his son's relationship with Glenda.

Cast
 Don Ameche as Ricardo Quintana
 Betty Grable as Glenda Crawford
 Carmen Miranda as Herself
 Charlotte Greenwood as Binnie Crawford
 J. Carrol Naish as Casiano
 Henry Stephenson as Don Diego Quintana
 Kay Aldridge as Helen Carson
 Leonid Kinskey as Tito Acuna
 Chris-Pin Martin as Esteban
 Robert Conway as Jimmy Blake
 Gregory Gaye as Sebastian, the Headwaiter
 Bobby Stone as Panchito
 Charles Judels as Dr. Arturo Padilla, the Ambassador
 Fayard Nicholas as Specialty Dancer (as The Nicholas Brothers)
 Harold Nicholas as Specialty Dancer (as The Nicholas Brothers)

Production 
The working title of this film was The South American Way. Down Argentine Way is considered the first of many Fox films made to implement industry-wide approach to President Franklin D. Roosevelt's "Good Neighbor Policy" toward Latin America. During World War II, the U.S. government developed an administrative agency to encourage good relations with Latin America, as there was growing German influence there. The Office of Inter-American Affairs was established to promote this. It specifically encouraged the production of "Good Neighbor" films.

Production of Down Argentine Way preceded the establishment of the Office of Inter-American Affairs, but was likely influenced by Roosevelt administration policy. The film was a box-office success, earning $2 million in domestic rentals in 1940. Fox continued to support government policy and its own self-interest by making films such as That Night in Rio and Week-End in Havana (both 1941). The films were a success in the United States, but failed as propaganda aimed at Latin America because they lacked regional authenticity.

A big star in her adopted country of Brazil, Carmen Miranda was a singer and dancer known for sex appeal. She signed a film contract with Fox in 1940 while she was appearing at a New York club, and Down Argentine Way was her first appearance in an American film. Since Miranda could not break her nightclub contract, her numbers for this film were shot in New York, while all other actors were working with director Irving Cummings in Los Angeles. Fox, with its revue approach to musicals, cut and pasted Miranda into the film. Miranda made several more films for 20th Century Fox, but the studio never was able to take advantage of the Brazilian star's special qualities to fit with American productions.

The film made Betty Grable, and began the period of her highest profile. Grable was cast in the film as a replacement for Alice Faye, who was originally intended for the female lead but became ill. Faye appeared in the follow-up films That Night in Rio and Week-End in Havana, which again feature Carmen Miranda.

The Hollywood Reporter noted that J. Carroll Naish's success in a comedy role in this film prompted Fox to feature him again in That Night in Rio. More recent sources, such as film historian W. Lee Cozad, cited the inclusion of actress Elena Verdugo (at age 14) among the cast in a bit part and note that this may have been her first film.

The movie was filmed in Los Angeles and at nearby Greenfield Ranch in Thousand Oaks, California.

Soundtrack 
 "Bambú, Bambú" — Carmen Miranda
 "Down Argentina Way" — Betty Grable and Don Ameche
 "Mamãe Eu Quero" — Carmen Miranda
 "Nenita" — Bando da Lua (Sung by Leonid Kinskey at the nightclub)
 "Sing to Your Señorita" — Charlotte Greenwood
 "Two Dreams Met" — Betty Grable and Don Ameche
 "South American Way" — Carmen Miranda

Box office 
Down Argentine Way was considered a box-office success in America, grossing $2 million in domestic sales. This paved the way for further ‘Good Neighbor’ films to be made and for Betty Grable and Carmen Miranda to become international sensations throughout the war years. “Down Argentine Way” was 20th Century Fox’s number one musical hit of 1940.

Critical reception 

In his review for the newspaper Chicago Reader, Dave Kehr said "Betty Grable as an American heiress, Don Ameche as an Argentine horse breeder, and Carmen Miranda as something from another planet, all shot in delirious 40s Technicolor. The result is a classic example of the 20th Century-Fox approach to musicals: loud, vulgar, ridiculous, and irresistibly entertaining."

The New York Times critic Bosley Crowther, reviewing the film, found Grable irresistible. At one point he referenced what he saw as her lack of ability: "We see plenty of [Grable] – singing, dancing and wearing clothes of surprising magnificence. We even see her trying to act, which is something less of a pleasure." But then, after referring to the film's play for profits and part in "Good Neighbor Policy", he backtracks: "But, hold – what sort of good neighbor would make a remark like that! Pardon us, Miss Grable. Consider it unmade."

Down Argentine Way marked the American film debut of Carmen Miranda (as she already had appeared in Brazilian films), already known as "the Brazilian Bombshell." Turner Classic Movies described her musical numbers in the movie as "a gaudy delight—and the Nicholas Brothers serve up a characteristically joyous, effervescent routine."

However, the film was banned in Argentina after being "hissed off the screens" by audiences there for misrepresenting the real culture of the country, wrongly including many Mexican and Caribbean mannerisms and costumes, as if they were part of the Argentine landscape. In 1941, an attache at the American Embassy in Buenos Aires reported that the film had ceased being shown in Argentina because of its "ridiculous and disturbing images":

Critics of the film have further remarked that the typical tango scene was contaminated by elements of Afro-Cuban rhumba and Spanish flamenco, which have nothing to do with the Argentine style.

The same criticism has been leveled against the legacy of Carmen Miranda. She has been accused by contemporary cultural writers of collaborating in the "Latino" stereotype creation for Hollywood, characterized by homogenizing all the diversity and differences between the Latin American nations into one identity, heavily influenced by Mexico and the Caribbean, and ignoring most of the other cultures within the continent. As author Karen Backstein observed, "Hollywood musicals went Down Argentine Way with 'Brazilian bombshell' Carmen Miranda and not a tango step visible anywhere."

Awards and honors
The film was nominated for three Oscars, for Best Cinematography, Best Original Song and for Best Art Direction by Richard Day and Joseph C. Wright.

In 2014, Down Argentine Way was deemed "culturally, historically, or aesthetically significant" by the Library of Congress and selected for preservation in the National Film Registry.

The film is recognized by American Film Institute in these lists:
 2006: AFI's Greatest Movie Musicals – Nominated

References

External links

Down Argentine Way essay by Carla Arton at National Film Registry
 
 
 
 

1940 films
1940s musical comedy-drama films
American musical comedy-drama films
American romantic comedy-drama films
American romantic musical films
Films directed by Irving Cummings
Films set in Argentina
Films set in New York City
20th Century Fox films
United States National Film Registry films
Films produced by Darryl F. Zanuck
1940s romantic comedy-drama films
1940s romantic musical films
1940 comedy films
1940 drama films
1940s American films
1940s English-language films